José Roberto Marques (31 May 1945 – 7 May 2016
) was a Brazilian footballer who competed in the 1964 Summer Olympics.

References

1945 births
2016 deaths
Association football forwards
Brazilian footballers
Olympic footballers of Brazil
Footballers at the 1964 Summer Olympics
São Paulo FC players
Club Athletico Paranaense players
Coritiba Foot Ball Club players
Sport Club Corinthians Paulista players
O'Higgins F.C. footballers
Expatriate footballers in Chile
Footballers from São Paulo (state)